Diplothrix is a genus of two species of rodents in the family Muridae. Diplothrix legata occurs in the Ryukyu Islands of Japan. Diplothrix yangziensis is known only from fossils collected in eastern China, dating to the Early Pleistocene.

References

Rodent genera
Mammal genera with one living species
Taxa named by Oldfield Thomas
Muridae
Taxonomy articles created by Polbot